Tanilogo, New South Wales, is a cadastral parish of Kennedy County New South Wales.

References

Parishes of Kennedy County